Melanie Bauschke (born 14 July 1988 in Berlin) is a German athlete, specializing in the long jump.  A versatile sprinter/hurdler, she has also scored over 5,000 points in the heptathlon.   She was the 2009 European under 23 champion in the long jump.  She picked up a silver medal in the high jump at the same competition.

Competition record

Personal bests
Outdoor
High jump – 1.90 m (Berlin 2009)
Long jump – 6.83 m (-0.3 m/s) (Kaunas 2009)

Indoor
60 metres – 7.85 (Potsdam 2010)
High jump – 1.89 m (Potsdam 2010)
Long jump – 6.68 m (Karlsruhe 2013)

References

External links

1988 births
Living people
German female long jumpers
Athletes from Berlin
Universiade medalists in athletics (track and field)
Universiade bronze medalists for Germany
Athletes (track and field) at the 2019 European Games
European Games medalists in athletics
European Games bronze medalists for Germany
Medalists at the 2011 Summer Universiade